The Swedish Shooting Sport Federation (SvSF) is a Swedish sport shooting association founded in 2009 by merging the three former organisations Swedish Sport Shooting Association (Svenska Sportskytteförbundet, SSF), Frivilliga Skytterörelsen (FSR) and Skytterörelsens Ungdomsorganisation (Skytte UO). In addition to being their well-known Nordic shooting disciplines, they are also affiliated internationally with the International Shooting Sport Federation (ISSF), Fédération Internationale de Tir aux Armes Sportives de Chasse (FITASC) and the International Precision Rifle Federation (IPRF).

See also 
 Swedish Dynamic Sports Shooting Association
 Norwegian Shooting Association and Det frivillige Skyttervesen
 Danish Gymnastics and Sports Associations

References

External links 
 Official website of the Swedish Shooting Sport Federation

2009 establishments in Sweden
Shooting sports organizations
Shooting
National members of the European Shooting Confederation